Flight 801 may refer to

 Líneas Aéreas La Urraca Flight 801, hijacked on 20 June 1969; see 1969 in aviation
, crashed on 21 September 1969
Malev Flight 801, crashed on 15 January 1975
Transbrasil Flight 801, crashed on 21 March 1989
Korean Air Flight 801, crashed on 6 August 1997

See also

 TWA Flight 801, a series of mixtapes by Charles Hamilton; see Charles Hamilton discography
 801 (disambiguation)

0801